The Fresno State Bulldogs are the intercollegiate athletic teams that represent California State University, Fresno (commonly referred to as Fresno State). The university is a member of NCAA Division I's Mountain West Conference (MW). It was a member of the Western Athletic Conference from 1992 until 2012, when it left for the Mountain West alongside fellow WAC member Nevada.

Fresno State had also been a member of the Big West Conference since the 1969–70 (the conference was known as the Pacific Coast Athletic Association at that time until 1988), and a member of the California Collegiate Athletic Association from its beginning in the 1939–40 season (when Fresno State was in NCAA Division II).

The university has won two NCAA Division I Championships, in softball (1998) and baseball (2008).

Fresno State currently sponsors six men's and eleven women's sports at the varsity level.

In October 2020, Fresno State announced the elimination of three programs due to COVID-19: Men's tennis, lacrosse, and wrestling.

Sports sponsored

All varsity teams representing Fresno State participate in the Mountain West Conference for conference play excluding water polo in the Golden Coast Conference, and equestrian in the Big 12 Conference.

Football

Fresno State's football team is currently coached by Jeff Tedford. During its tenure in the Western Athletic Conference (WAC) from 1992 to 2011, it shared three WAC titles; in 1992 and 1993 under Head Coach Jim Sweeney, and in 1999 with the University of Hawaii, the only title for Pat Hill. However, Hill garnered a reputation for being willing to play any top-ranked opponent, anytime, anywhere (usually on the opponent's field). Fresno State (as of December 2005) achieved success with a 10–8 record against teams from BCS conferences, the most by any program not in a BCS conference. This has provided the Bulldogs a following among college football fans who admire its willingness to challenge the best teams (and has resulted in the Bulldogs being featured more regularly on college football TV programs than most BCS non-AQ conference teams). However, their success in their non-conference games hasn't translated to championships in conference play. After 1999, the Bulldogs did not win the WAC title before leaving for the MW in 2012. In 2013, the first season after the MW expanded to 12 football members and launched a conference championship game, the Bulldogs claimed the MW title.

Fresno State often travels between 10,000-20,000 miles (30,000 km) during its football season, between its MW games and its non-conference schedule, as the conference itself is spread from the Colorado Front Range to Honolulu. During Fresno State's time in the WAC, its travel was on the higher end of the range, as that conference's footprint extended even farther to the east than that of the MW (as far as Ruston, Louisiana, home of Louisiana Tech University).  Boise State and Hawaii are two of Fresno State's major in-conference rivals. Boise State joined the MW in 2011, a year before Fresno State, while Hawaii joined for football only at the same time Fresno State joined in all sports.

The Fresno State Bulldogs men's football team have an NCAA Division I FBS Tournament record of 12–13 through twenty-four appearances.

Basketball

Bulldog basketball squads play at the Save Mart Center.  This facility used to house the ECHL's Fresno Falcons hockey team and is regularly on the Pollstar list of top 25 concert and entertainment venues by attendance.

The Women's Basketball program has enjoyed its best run of success in recent years under coach Adrian Wiggins. He is the only Fresno State coach in program history to not have a losing season and is averaging 23 wins per season in his five full seasons. More impressive is that Wiggins has guided the program to its only four NCAA tournament appearances in 2008, 2009, 2010, and 2011. With Fresno State moving to the Mountain West Conference, the 2011–2012 season is the last chance for the Bulldogs to win a 5th straight Western Athletic Conference championship.

The Men's Basketball program achieved its greatest moment winning the 1983 National Invitational tournament championship.  Coach Boyd Grant guided the Bulldogs through the 32 team NIT field, winning the final 69–60 over DePaul.  Hundreds of fans known as the Red Wave followed the team from Fresno's Selland Arena, its home court at the time, to Madison Square Garden in New York.  Jerry Tarkanian followed Grant as Coach.  Coach Steve Cleveland took over in 2005 and made an immediate impact on the troubled basketball program which was still facing sanctions from the Jerry Tarkanian and Ray Lopes era. Cleveland's "Built to Last" approach placed a paramount emphasis on graduating student-athletes. Cleveland's system produced the program's first Academic All-District VIII honoree when sophomore forward Nedeljko Golubovic received the elite recognition in February 2009, which he repeated for back-to-back-to-back CoSIDA accolades as the only University Division student-athlete from a California college honored in any district in each season. In 2009, Golubovic was also the lone representative from a Western Athletic Conference school honored. The WAC also designated Golubovic and freshman guard Brandon Sperling for Academic All-WAC accolades for their accomplishments during 2008–09.

However, due to a lack of winning, and mounting pressure from the community, Coach Cleveland stepped down as Head Coach in 2011.

He was replaced by Rodney Terry, the top assistant from the University of Texas. Terry will be the 18th head coach in Bulldog history. Known as an outstanding recruiting and bench coach while at Texas, Terry's resume includes coaching two national players of the year and 11 appearances in the NCAA tournament.

Baseball

The Fresno State baseball team is currently coached by Mike Batesole and has made 4 trips to the College World Series in its history, most recently to the 2008 College World Series. On June 25, 2008, the Fresno State Bulldogs defeated the Georgia Bulldogs to win the 2008 College World Series.

Beiden Field was the former home of the Pacific Coast League (AAA) farm team of the San Francisco Giants (1998–2001).  The Fresno Grizzlies moved to their current downtown stadium in May 2002.  Beiden Field is often listed by Baseball America as a top-25 NCAA baseball facility.  It hosted the 2006 WAC baseball tournament.

Cross country

The Fresno State Bulldogs men's cross country team appeared in the NCAA Division I Tournament one time, with that appearance being 22nd place in the 1973–74 school year. The Fresno State Bulldogs women's cross country team never made the NCAA Division I Tournament.

Soccer

The Fresno State Bulldogs women's soccer team have an NCAA Division I Tournament record of 0–4 through four appearances.

Softball

The perennial national power Bulldog women's softball team has had a lengthy tradition of winning since the inception of the sport. The Bulldogs have appeared in twelve Women's College World Series in 1982, 1984, 1987, 1988, 1989, 1990, 1991, 1992, 1994, 1997, 1998 and 1999, playing in the title game five times. The softball team owns the distinction of winning the school's first team NCAA national championship in 1998. Fresno State defeated then-top ranked Arizona 1–0 in the 1998 NCAA championship game in Oklahoma City due to the strong arm of All-American pitcher Amanda Scott and the bat of All-American Nina Lindenberg, who scored the game's only run on a solo home run.  The Bulldogs finished the season with a 52–11 record and ranked No. 1 in the nation.  Arizona entered the 1998 national championship game against Fresno State with a 67–3 overall record.

Through the 2010 season, Fresno State was the nation's only softball team to have earned bids to all 29 NCAA Division I championship tournaments.  In addition to Fresno State's 1998 NCAA championship, the Bulldogs reached the NCAA championship game four other times (1982, 1988, 1989, 1990).  The Bulldogs were coached by Margie Wright, the nation's winningest Division I coach in the sport, up until 2012, when she retired. Wright, who has led Fresno State to 10 Western Athletic Conference championships in the last 13 years and 18 league crowns overall, finished her 25th season as the head coach Bulldogs in 2010.  She entered the 2009 season having won 1,307 games in her career. After Wright, the Bulldogs were coached by Trisha Ford, who previously coached at Stanford. Since Ford had taken the reins, the Bulldogs have had some very strong seasons, including the 2016 season, where the Bulldogs quickly reached 24th in the nation after just their first weekend of play. The Bulldogs are now coached by Linda Garza

The Bulldogs currently have the most women in NCAA history who have sported a sub 1.00 ERA with 7.

Men's golf
The men's golf team has won 13 conference championships:
Big West Conference (10): 1976, 1979–80, 1983, 1986–91 (co-champion in 1987)
Western Athletic Conference (3): 1994, 2000, 2003

Their best finish in the NCAA Championship was fifth in 1990.

Bulldogs who have had success at the professional level include: Jerry Heard (five PGA Tour wins), Tim Norris (one PGA Tour win), John Erickson (one PGA Tour Canada win) Kevin Sutherland (one PGA Tour win), and Nick Watney  (five PGA Tour wins)

Volleyball

The Fresno State Bulldogs women's volleyball team have an NCAA Division I Tournament record of 2–4 through four appearances.

Wrestling
Wrestling was dropped from varsity status in 2006 following a string of lean budget years and gender equity issues. In 2014, University President Joseph Castro pledged to reinstate wrestling, along with the addition of at least one new women's sport. On February 28, 2015, newly appointed athletic director Jim Bartko announced his plan to reinstate wrestling. The process would include fundraising, hiring a coach, and recruiting in a state with only three Division I programs (Stanford, CSU Bakersfield, Cal Poly San Luis Obispo). To satisfy the Title IX requirement, Fresno State added women's water polo, bringing the total number of Bulldog teams to 22. Both teams started competition in the 2017–18 season. In May 2016, Fresno State named Troy Steiner, who won a national championship with Iowa in 1992, its head coach. In its first season back on the mat, the Bulldogs went 4-16 (1-5 in the Big XII) and had two NCAA qualifiers, finishing T62 out of 72 teams.

The wrestling team was an associate member of the Big 12 Conference, joining Mountain West conference rivals Wyoming and Air Force, since their primary conference does not sponsor wrestling.

In its first iteration, wrestling at Fresno State produced 33 All-Americans and 2004 Olympic silver medalist Stephen Abas. In its second year back, Josh Hokit became an All-American with a fifth-place finish.

The Fresno State Bulldogs men's wrestling team appeared in the NCAA Division I Tournament thirty-four times, with their highest finish being 8th place in the 1992–93 school year.

In response to financial challenges faced by Fresno State, the wrestling program was dropped at the conclusion of the 2020–21 academic year.

Notable non-varsity sports

Rugby
The Fresno State Rugby Football Club was founded in 1971, although rugby was played at the old Fresno State College as early as 1934. In August 2022, Fresno State moved its rugby team from the Division 1 Pacific Western Conference to the California Conference as a Division IAA team.

Championships

Appearances

The Fresno State Bulldogs competed in the NCAA tournament across 17 active sports (9 men's and 8 women's) 297 times at the Division I FBS level.

 Baseball (34): 1954, 1955, 1959, 1961, 1962, 1966, 1967, 1977, 1979, 1980, 1981, 1982, 1983, 1984, 1985, 1988, 1989, 1990, 1991, 1992, 1993, 1994, 1995, 1996, 1997, 2000, 2001, 2006, 2007, 2008, 2009, 2011, 2012, 2019
 Men's basketball (6): 1981, 1982, 1984, 2000, 2001, 2016
 Women's basketball (7): 2008, 2009, 2010, 2011, 2012, 2013, 2014
 Men's cross country (1): 1973
 Football (25): 1944, 1961, 1982, 1985, 1988, 1989, 1991, 1992, 1993, 1999, 2000, 2001, 2002, 2003, 2004, 2005, 2007, 2008, 2009, 2010, 2012, 2013, 2014, 2017, 2018
 Men's golf (21): 1958, 1960, 1964, 1967, 1977, 1979, 1980, 1981, 1983, 1984, 1985, 1986, 1987
• 1989, 1990, 1992, 1993, 1994, 1998, 2000, 2002
 Women's soccer (4): 1999, 2005, 2008, 2010
 Softball (33): 1982, 1983, 1984, 1985, 1986, 1987, 1988, 1989, 1990, 1991, 1992, 1993, 1994, 1995, 1996, 1997, 1998, 1999, 2000, 2001, 2002, 2003, 2004, 2005, 2006, 2007, 2008, 2009, 2010, 2011, 2015, 2016, 2017
 Women's swimming and diving (6): 1996, 1997, 1998, 1999, 2013, 2014
 Men's tennis (14): 1994, 1995, 1996, 1997, 1998, 1999, 2000, 2001, 2003, 2004, 2010, 2011, 2012, 2019
 Women's tennis (17): 1996, 1997, 1998, 1999, 2000, 2001, 2002, 2003, 2004, 2005, 2006, 2007, 2008, 2009, 2011, 2014, 2018
 Men's indoor track and field (16): 1965, 1980, 1981, 1982, 1983, 1986, 1987, 1988, 1990, 1992, 1993, 1994, 1995, 1996, 1998, 1999
 Women's indoor track and field (10): 1985, 1986, 1987, 1988, 1993, 1994, 1996, 1998, 1999, 2009
 Men's outdoor track and field (49): 1934, 1935, 1939, 1940, 1941, 1942, 1943, 1944, 1945, 1947, 1948, 1951, 1952, 1953, 1954, 1955, 1956, 1957, 1958, 1963, 1964, 1965, 1968, 1969, 1972, 1973, 1974, 1977, 1980, 1981, 1982, 1983, 1984, 1985, 1986, 1987, 1988, 1989, 1990, 1991, 1992, 1993, 1994, 1996, 1998, 1999, 2000, 2001, 2008
 Women's outdoor track and field (15): 1983, 1984, 1985, 1986, 1987, 1988, 1990, 1991, 1993, 1996, 1997, 2004, 2007, 2009, 2016
 Women's volleyball (4): 1984, 1991, 1998, 2002
 Wrestling (35): 1962, 1967, 1968, 1970, 1971, 1972, 1973, 1974, 1977, 1983, 1984, 1985, 1986, 1987, 1988, 1989, 1990, 1991, 1992, 1993, 1994, 1995, 1996, 1997, 1998, 1999, 2000, 2001, 2002, 2003, 2004, 2005, 2006, 2018, 2019

Team

The Bulldogs of Fresno State earned 2 NCAA championships at the Division I level.

Men's (1)
 Baseball (1): 2008
Women's (1)
 Softball (1): 1998

Results

Fresno State won 2 national championships at the NCAA Division II level.

 Men's outdoor track and field: 1964
 Men's tennis: 1968

Below are five national club team championships:

 Men's bowling (1): 2011 (USBC)
 Men's judo (2): 1985, 1988 (NCJA)
 Women's judo (2): 1989, 1990 (NCJA)

Individual

Fresno State had 19 Bulldogs win NCAA individual championships at the Division I level.

At the NCAA Division II level, Fresno State garnered 10 individual championships.

Sports facilities
Valley Children's Stadium, football
Save Mart Center, basketball, volleyball, wrestling
Pete Beiden Field, baseball
Bulldog Diamond, softball
Soccer and Lacrosse Field, soccer and women's lacrosse
Dragonfly Golf Club, golf
Fresno State Aquatics Center, aquatics
Student Horse Center, equestrian
Warmerdam Field, track and field
Spalding G. Wathen Tennis Center, tennis
Woodward Park, cross country

Traditions
 Red & Blue: When Fresno State was choosing the school colors, the women's teams wanted blue and white while the men's teams wanted red and white; the school decided to choose red and blue (officially, cardinal and navy blue) as a compromise.
The Cardinal was in emulation of the colors of Stanford University and the Blue in emulation of the colors of the University of California.
 Victor E. Bulldog: The bulldog mascot was chosen when, in 1921, a white bulldog appeared on campus and immediately took to the student body president and his friends. His name is Victor E. The current mascot of Fresno State has the name  Victor E. Bulldog III. He was born on March 14, 2015.
 V is for Valley: The green "V" featured on Fresno State uniforms is a tribute to the agricultural community of the San Joaquin Valley, the world's richest agricultural area in export dollars in which Fresno is located. The tribute began in 1997 when new football head coach Pat Hill instituted the green V on the back of the helmets (a tradition later adopted by the other programs) as a means of integrating the school and the community.

References

External links